Castelo Rá-Tim-Bum is a 1999 Brazilian film directed by Cao Hamburger, based on the Castelo Rá-Tim-Bum TV series.

Plot
In Castelo Rá-Tim-Bum 300-year-old Nino looks like he is eight or nine years old. Described by Graeber as a "Brazilian counterpart" to Harry Potter, Nino tries to write a book of spells. His aunt and uncle criticize his apprenticeship and Nino wants to play with ordinary children. Losangela, a relative, begins conspiring with real estate developers who hope to tear down Nino's family's mansion.

Cast
Diegho Kozievitch as Antônino "Nino" Stradivarius
Rosi Campos as Morgana Stradivarius
Sérgio Mamberti as Dr. Victor Stradivarius
Marieta Severo as Losângela Stradivarius
Pascoal da Conceição as Abobrinha
Matheus Nachtergaele as Rato
Ângela Dip as Pénelope
Leandro Léo as João
Mayara Constantino as Cacau
Oscar Neto as Ronaldo

Reception
Castelo Rá-Tim-Bum grossed R$3,031,875 and was watched by 725,329 people in the 134 Brazilian theaters in which it was released. It was nominated for the 2nd Grande Prêmio Cinema Brasil for Best Film, Best Screenplay, and Best Release, and Vera Hamburger and Clóvis Bueno won the Best Art Direction Award. At the 2000 Chicago International Children's Film Festival it won the "Children's Jury Prize – International Feature Film or Video - Live Action". Critical-wise, Laurel Graeber of The New York Times said that it "charmingly captures the life of a Latin-style Addams Family."

References

External links

 

1999 films
1999 children's films
1999 comedy films
1999 fantasy films
1990s adventure comedy films
1990s children's adventure films
1990s children's comedy films
1990s children's fantasy films
1990s fantasy adventure films
1990s fantasy comedy films
1990s Portuguese-language films
Brazilian adventure comedy films
Brazilian children's films
Brazilian fantasy comedy films
Films about families
Films about witchcraft
Films based on television series
Films directed by Cao Hamburger
Films set in castles